"Foolish Little Girl" is a song written by Helen Miller and Howard Greenfield and performed by The Shirelles.  The song reached #4 on the Billboard Hot 100, #9 on the R&B chart, and #38 on the UK Singles Chart in 1963.  The song appeared on their 1963 album, Foolish Little Girl.
The song was ranked #57 on Billboard magazine's Top Hot 100 songs of 1963.

Background
Cash Box described it as "a most attractive, easy beat cha cha romancer."
The song released as a single was a demo recorded at Associated Studios in NYC on 7th Avenue. The plan was to re record the song at the studios Scepter Records had access to at the time, but when their attempts at re recording the song at their studios proved to be unsatisfactory, Luther Dixon sent out The Shirelles to record their vocals on the demo version of the song at Associated, and that was the version that was released as a single and that was the version that became a hit.

Personnel

The Shirelles' version
Lead vocals by Shirley Owens and Beverly Lee
Spoken intro by Doris Coley
Backing vocals by Addie "Micki" Harris, Doris Coley, and Beverly Lee
Charles Macey: Guitar and Upright Bass
Buddy Saltzman: Drums 
Leroy Glover: Organ.

Chart performance

Other versions
Jin sampled the song on his song "Foolish Little Girls" from his 2005 album, The Emcee's Properganda.
Dionne Bromfield released a version on her 2009 album, Introducing Dionne Bromfield.

In media
The song was used in Act II in the 2009 jukebox musical, Baby It's You!.

References

1963 songs
1963 singles
Songs written by Helen Miller (songwriter)
Songs with lyrics by Howard Greenfield
The Shirelles songs
Dionne Bromfield songs
Scepter Records singles
Songs from musicals